"Papa Do" is a song written by Lynsey de Paul and Barry Blue, who are credited as Rubin and Green. The song was released as a single performed by Barry Green (aka Blue) in 1972 backed with "Boomerang" on the Decca label (both songs credited as written by Rubin and Green respectively) and had a modicum of chart success in Spain, France and Sweden. The Dutch group, Cardinal Point, recorded a version which was similar in style to that recorded by Green, as a track on their self-named album, and the Greek group, The Daltons, also released a version of the song as a single. The song was re-titled "Mama Do" and the text slightly modified for de Paul's own jazzed up version, that served as the opening track for her debut album, Surprise, which was released in 1973. In January 1974, Decca Records re-released the single to capitalize on Barry Blue's chart success and it received positive reviews.

Barry Green's version of the song appeared on CD on the compilation album The Electric Asylum, Vol. 5: Rare British Freakrock in 2010. The Dalton's version was included on a various artists compilation CD in 2008.

References

Lynsey de Paul songs
Songs written by Lynsey de Paul
Songs written by Barry Blue